This was the seventeenth season for the League Cup, known as the John Player Special Trophy for sponsorship purposes.

St. Helens won the final, beating Leeds by the score of 15-14. The match was played at Central Park, Wigan. The attendance was 16,669 and receipts were £62232.

Background 
This season saw no changes in the  entrants, no new members and no withdrawals, the number remaining at thirty-six
Blackpool Borough moved to Springfield Park in Wigan and renamed as Springfield Borough

Competition and results

Preliminary round 

Involved  4 matches and 8 Clubs

Round 1 - First  Round 

Involved  16 matches and 32 Clubs

Round 1 - First  Round Replays 
Involved  1 match and 2 Clubs

Round 2 - Second  Round 

Involved  8 matches and 16 Clubs

Round 3 -Quarter Finals 

Involved 4 matches with 8 clubs

Round 4 – Semi-Finals 

Involved 2 matches and 4 Clubs

Final

Teams and scorers 

Scoring - Try = four points - Goal = two points - Drop goal = one point

Prize money 
As part of the sponsorship deal and funds, the  prize money awarded to the competing teams for this season is as follows :-

Note - the  author is unable to trace the award amounts for this season. Can anyone help ?

The road to success 
This tree excludes any preliminary round fixtures

Notes and comments 
1 * Heworth are a Junior (amateur) club from York
2 * Thatto Heath are a Junior (amateur) club from St Helens
3 * RUGBYLEAGUEproject give score as 38-2 but Wigan official archives gives it as 37-2   
4 * RUGBYLEAGUEproject give Halifax at home but Wigan official archives gives Keighley at home but with a reference that the  game was played at Thrum Hall, the  home of Halifax
5  * Central Park was the home ground of Wigan with a final capacity of 18,000, although the record attendance was  47,747 for Wigan v St Helens 27 March 1959

General information for those unfamiliar 
The council of the Rugby Football League voted to introduce a new competition, to be similar to The Football Association and Scottish Football Association's "League Cup". It was to be a similar knock-out structure to, and to be secondary to, the Challenge Cup. As this was being formulated, sports sponsorship was becoming more prevalent and as a result John Player and Sons, a division of Imperial Tobacco Company, became sponsors, and the competition never became widely known as the "League Cup" 
The competition ran from 1971-72 until 1995-96 and was initially intended for the professional clubs plus the two amateur BARLA National Cup finalists. In later seasons the entries were expanded to take in other amateur and French teams. The competition was dropped due to "fixture congestion" when Rugby League became a summer sport
The Rugby League season always (until the onset of "Summer Rugby" in 1996) ran from around August-time through to around May-time and this competition always took place early in the season, in the Autumn, with the final usually taking place in late January 
The competition was variably known, by its sponsorship name, as the Player's No.6 Trophy (1971–1977), the John Player Trophy (1977–1983), the John Player Special Trophy (1983–1989), and the Regal Trophy in 1989.

See also 
1987-88 Rugby Football League season
1987 Lancashire Cup
1987 Yorkshire Cup
John Player Special Trophy
Rugby league county cups

References

External links
Saints Heritage Society
1896–97 Northern Rugby Football Union season at wigan.rlfans.com 
Hull&Proud Fixtures & Results 1896/1897
Widnes Vikings - One team, one passion Season In Review - 1896-97
The Northern Union at warringtonwolves.org
Huddersfield R L Heritage
Wakefield until I die

1987 in English rugby league
1988 in English rugby league
League Cup (rugby league)